Henderson Island is an ice-covered island  long and rising to , lying  southeast of Masson Island within the Shackleton Ice Shelf. Henderson Island was discovered in August 1912 by the Western Base Party of the Australian Antarctic Expedition under Sir Douglas Mawson and named by him for Prof. G. C. Henderson of Adelaide, a member of the Australian Antarctic Expedition Advisory Committee.

See also
 Composite Antarctic Gazetteer
 List of Antarctic and sub-Antarctic islands
 List of Antarctic islands south of 60° S
 SCAR
 Territorial claims in Antarctica
The Quest for Frank Wild by Angie Butler (contains his original memoirs)

References

External links

Islands of Queen Mary Land